The 2001 NBA draft took place on June 27, 2001 in New York City, New York. Kwame Brown became the first high school player to be drafted with the first overall pick in the history of the NBA. The selection of Kwame Brown by the Washington Wizards, over players that have gone on to have more successful NBA careers, has been a source of great criticism by numerous media outlets.  Several international players from this draft, Pau Gasol (Spain), Tony Parker (France) and Mehmet Okur (Turkey), became NBA All-Stars.

The Minnesota Timberwolves forfeited their first-round pick due to salary cap violations. It would be the first of two first rounders that would have to forfeit their picks during the early 2000s.

Eight of the players selected in this draft would never play in an NBA game in their professional basketball careers. Both of the players drafted by the New York Knicks (Michael Wright and Eric Chenowith) were among this group.

Draft selections

Notable undrafted players
These players were not selected in the draft  but have played at least one game in the NBA.

Early entrants

College underclassmen
The following college basketball players successfully applied for early draft entrance.

  Gilbert Arenas – G, Arizona (sophomore)
  Brandon Armstrong – G, Pepperdine (junior)
  Malcolm Battles – F, Point Mark (junior)
  Tavorris Bell – F, Rhode Island (junior)
  Preston Bennett – F, Grayson (freshman)
  Michael Bradley – F, Villanova (junior)
  Jamison Brewer – G, Auburn (sophomore)
  Kedrick Brown – F, Okaloosa-Walton CC (sophomore)
  SirValiant Brown – G, George Washington (sophomore)
  Nick Burwell – G, Orange Coast (sophomore)
  Jason Collins – C, Stanford (junior)
  Omar Cook – G, St. John's (freshman)
  Samuel Dalembert – C/F, Seton Hall (sophomore)
  Maurice Evans – G, Texas (junior)
  Benjamin Eze – F, Southern Idaho (freshman)
  Alton Ford – F, Houston (freshman)
  Joseph Forte – G, North Carolina (sophomore)
  Jerry Green – G, UC Irvine (junior)
  Eddie Griffin – F, Seton Hall (freshman)
  Rob Griffin – F, Kentucky Wesleyan (junior)
  Trenton Hassell – G, Austin Peay (junior)
  Kirk Haston – F, Indiana (junior)
  Draper Housley – G, Lee College (sophomore)
  Steven Hunter – C/F, DePaul (sophomore)
  Richard Jefferson – F, Arizona (junior)
  Joe Johnson – F/G, Arkansas (sophomore)
  D. A. Layne – G, Georgia (junior)
  Zach Marbury – G, Rhode Island (sophomore)
  Jamario Moon – F, Meridian (freshman)
  Troy Murphy – F, Notre Dame (junior)
  Zach Randolph – F, Michigan State (freshman)
  Jason Richardson – G, Michigan State (sophomore)
  Kenny Satterfield – G, Cincinnati (sophomore)
  Bobby Simmons – F, DePaul (junior)
  Will Solomon – G, Clemson (junior)
  Clifton Terry – F, Kennedy–King (sophomore)
  Gerald Wallace – F/G, Alabama (freshman)
  Rodney White – F, Charlotte (freshman)
  Michael Wright – F, Arizona (junior)

High school players
The following high school players successfully applied for early draft entrance.

  Kwame Brown – F, Glynn Academy (Brunswick, Georgia)
  Tyson Chandler – F/C, Dominguez High School (Compton, California)
  Ousmane Cisse – F, St. Jude Educational Institute (Montgomery, Alabama)
  Eddy Curry – C/F, Thornwood High School (South Holland, Illinois)
  DeSagana Diop – C, Oak Hill Academy (Mouth of Wilson, Virginia)
  Tony Key – C, Centennial High School (Compton, California)

International players
The following international players successfully applied for early draft entrance.

  Denis Ershov – C, Pulkovo Saint Petersburg (Russia)
  Antonis Fotsis – F, Panathinaikos (Greece)
  Pau Gasol – F, FC Barcelona (Spain)
  Raül López – G, Real Madrid (Spain)
  Tony Parker – G, Paris Basket Racing (France)
  Vladimir Radmanović – F, FMP (FR Yugoslavia)

Other eligible players

See also
 List of first overall NBA draft picks

References

External links
 NBA.com: 2001 NBA Draft
 Basketball Reference: 2001 NBA Draft

Draft
National Basketball Association draft
NBA draft
NBA draft
2000s in Manhattan
Basketball in New York City
Sporting events in New York City
Sports in Manhattan
Madison Square Garden